Adobe Creek is the name of several streams:

Rivers
California
 Adobe Creek (Santa Clara County, California), a tributary of San Francisco Bay in Santa Clara County
 Adobe Creek (Sonoma County, California), a tributary of the Petaluma River in Sonoma County
 Adobe Creek (Lake County, California), a tributary of Clear Lake (California)